Application virtualization software refers to both application virtual machines and software responsible for implementing them. Application virtual machines are typically used to allow application bytecode to run portably on many different computer architectures and operating systems. The application is usually run on the computer using an interpreter or just-in-time compilation (JIT). There are often several implementations of a given virtual machine, each covering a different set of functions.

Comparison of virtual machines
JavaScript machines not included. See List of ECMAScript engines to find them.

The table here summarizes elements for which the virtual machine designs are intended to be efficient, not the list of abilities present in any implementation.

Virtual machine instructions process data in local variables using a main model of computation, typically that of a stack machine, register machine, or random access machine often called the memory machine. Use of these three methods is motivated by different tradeoffs in virtual machines vs physical machines, such as ease of interpreting, compiling, and verifying for security.

Memory management in these portable virtual machines is addressed at a higher level of abstraction than in physical machines. Some virtual machines, such as the popular Java virtual machines (JVM), are involved with addresses in such a way as to require safe automatic memory management by allowing the virtual machine to trace pointer references, and disallow machine instructions from manually constructing pointers to memory. Other virtual machines, such as LLVM, are more like traditional physical machines, allowing direct use and manipulation of pointers. Common Intermediate Language (CIL) offers a hybrid in between, allowing both controlled use of memory (like the JVM, which allows safe automatic memory management), while also allowing an 'unsafe' mode that allows direct pointer manipulation in ways that can violate type boundaries and permission.

Code security generally refers to the ability of the portable virtual machine to run code while offering it only a prescribed set of abilities. For example, the virtual machine might only allow the code access to a certain set of functions or data. The same controls over pointers which make automatic memory management possible and allow the virtual machine to ensure typesafe data access are used to assure that a code fragment is only allowed to certain elements of memory and cannot bypass the virtual machine itself. Other security mechanisms are then layered on top as code verifiers, stack verifiers, and other methods.

An interpreter allows programs made of virtual instructions to be loaded and run immediately without a potentially costly compile into native machine instructions. Any virtual machine which can be run can be interpreted, so the column designation here refers to whether the design includes provisions for efficient interpreting (for common usage).

Just-in-time compilation (JIT), refers to a method of compiling to native instructions at the latest possible time, usually immediately before or during the running of the program. The challenge of JIT is more one of implementation than of virtual machine design, however, modern designs have begun to make considerations to help efficiency. The simplest JIT methods simply compile to a code fragment similar to an offline compiler. However, more complex methods are often employed, which specialize compiled code fragments to parameters known only at runtime (see Adaptive optimization).

Ahead-of-time compilation (AOT) refers to the more classic method of using a precompiler to generate a set of native instructions which do not change during the runtime of the program. Because aggressive compiling and optimizing can take time, a precompiled program may launch faster than one which relies on JIT alone for execution. JVM implementations have mitigated this startup cost by initial interpreting to speed launch times, until native code fragments can be generated by JIT.

Shared libraries are a facility to reuse segments of native code across multiple running programs. In modern operating systems, this generally means using virtual memory to share the memory pages containing a shared library across different processes which are protected from each other via memory protection. It is interesting that aggressive JIT methods such as adaptive optimization often produce code fragments unsuitable for sharing across processes or successive runs of the program, requiring a tradeoff be made between the efficiencies of precompiled and shared code and the advantages of adaptively specialized code. For example, several design provisions of CIL are present to allow for efficient shared libraries, possibly at the cost of more specialized JIT code. The JVM implementation on OS X uses a Java Shared Archive to provide some of the benefits of shared libraries.

Comparison of application virtual machine implementations

In addition to the portable virtual machines described above, virtual machines are often used as an execution model for individual scripting languages, usually by an interpreter. This table lists specific virtual machine implementations, both of the above portable virtual machines, and of scripting language virtual machines.

See also
 Application virtualization
 Language binding
 Foreign function interface
 Calling convention
 Name mangling
 Application programming interface (API)
 Application binary interface (ABI)
 Comparison of platform virtualization software
 List of ECMAScript engines
 WebAssembly

References

application virtualization software
 

pt:Comparação entre aplicações de virtualização de máquinas